Thames Christian School, is a private co-educational secondary school, aged 11 to 18, in London at 12 Grant Road, London, SW11 2FR adjacent to Clapham Junction Station.

Most pupils come from Wandsworth, Lambeth, Merton, Southwark, Lewisham, Westminster and Kensington and Chelsea and Hammersmith and Fulham but some come from as far away as Greenwich, Bromley, Croydon, Kingston, Richmond, Hounslow and Tower Hamlets.

References 

2000 establishments in England
Educational institutions established in 2000
Private co-educational schools in London
Private schools in the London Borough of Wandsworth